Govindpalle is a small village on the outskirts of Jagtial town, Karimnagar district, Telangana, India.

Villages in Karimnagar district